Romuva may refer to:

 Romuva (temple), an ancient worship place in Old Prussia 
 Romuva (religion), a pagan movement in modern Lithuania
 Lithuanian name for Pravdinsk, town in Kaliningrad Oblast, Russia
 Romuva, heaven in the philosophical writings of Vydūnas